Vacation from Marriage may refer to:

 Perfect Strangers (1945 film), a British drama film title Vacation from Marriage in the U.S.
 Vacation from Marriage (1927 film), a German silent comedy film